Dana James Eveland (born October 29, 1983) is an American former professional baseball pitcher. He  played in Major League Baseball (MLB) for the Milwaukee Brewers, Arizona Diamondbacks, Oakland Athletics, Toronto Blue Jays, Pittsburgh Pirates, Los Angeles Dodgers, Baltimore Orioles, New York Mets, Atlanta Braves, and Tampa Bay Rays. Eveland has also played in the KBO League for the Hanwha Eagles.

Early life
Eveland attended Palmdale High School in Palmdale, California, graduating in 2001. After one year at Hill College in Hillsboro, Texas, he transferred to College of the Canyons in Santa Clarita, California.

Professional career

Milwaukee Brewers
Eveland was drafted by the Milwaukee Brewers in the 16th round (469th overall) of the 2002 MLB draft.

On July 16, Eveland made his MLB debut against the Washington Nationals. He would ultimately pitch out of the bullpen, appearing in 27 games, while posting a record of 1–1. The following season he would appear in nine games, with five starts. Eveland's record in 2006 was 0–3, with an 8.13 ERA.

Arizona Diamondbacks
After two seasons with the Brewers, Eveland was traded to the Arizona Diamondbacks on November 26, 2006 along with Doug Davis and Dave Krynzel in exchange for Greg Aquino, Johnny Estrada, and Claudio Vargas. He appeared in only five games for the Diamondbacks.

Oakland Athletics
On December 14, 2007, Eveland was dealt again as part of a six-player trade to the Oakland Athletics for Dan Haren and Connor Robertson.

In 2008, he made 29 starts for the Athletics, the most of his career. His record was 9–9 with a 4.34 ERA. He also gave up 27 four-pitch walks, the most in the majors.

The following season, Eveland finished 2–4 in 13 games, with nine starts and a 7.16 ERA. He was designated for assignment on February 1, 2010.

Toronto Blue Jays
On February 6, 2010, Eveland was acquired by the Toronto Blue Jays, in exchange for a player to be named later or cash considerations.

He started nine games, in which he went 3–4 with a 6.45 ERA, and was designated for assignment on May 24, 2010.

Pittsburgh Pirates
On June 1, 2010, Eveland was traded from the Blue Jays to the Pittsburgh Pirates for Ronald Uviedo. He appeared in only 3 games for the Pirates, 1 of which was a start. On June 24, 2010, he was designated for assignment.

Los Angeles Dodgers
On November 22, 2010, Eveland agreed to a minor league split contract with the Los Angeles Dodgers. He was assigned to the Triple-A Albuquerque Isotopes. He was selected to both the Pacific Coast League midseason  and postseason  All-Star teams. He made 25 starts for the Isotopes in 2011, with a 12–8 record and 4.38 ERA.

On September 1, 2011, The Dodgers called him up to MLB to start against the Pittsburgh Pirates. In that game he picked up the win while allowing only one run in eight innings. He wound up making 5 starts with the Dodgers in September, with a 3–2 record, 3.03 ERA and 16 strikeouts. He had extreme splits in his short time with the Dodgers. In 3 road starts he was 3–0 with an 0.44 ERA but in his two starts at Dodger Stadium he was 0–2 with a 9.00 ERA.

Baltimore Orioles

He was traded from the Dodgers to the Baltimore Orioles on December 8, 2011. Eveland was designated for assignment on March 29, 2012. He was called up from Triple-A Norfolk on July 26.

Hanwha Eagles
He signed with the Hanwha Eagles in the Korea Baseball Organization for 2013.

New York Mets
He signed a minor league contract with the New York Mets on February 18, 2014.

Boston Red Sox
Eveland agreed to a minor league contract with the Boston Red Sox on January 21, 2015. The deal was officially announced eight days later. On June 5, Eveland opted out of his minor league deal.

Atlanta Braves
Eveland signed a minor league deal with the Atlanta Braves on June 7, 2015. He was assigned to the AAA Gwinnett Braves. He was designated for assignment along with Nick Masset on July 5 to create room for David Carpenter whose contract was purchased and Arodys Vizcaíno who was activated from the restricted list.

Second stint with Baltimore
On July 17, 2015, Eveland signed a minor league deal with the Baltimore Orioles for a second time.

Tampa Bay Rays
On December 14, 2015, Eveland signed a minor league deal with the Tampa Bay Rays with an invitation to spring training. He made 33 appearances for the Rays in 2016, and pitched to a 9.00 ERA in 23 total innings. On November 2, 2016, Eveland signed a new minor league contract with the Rays. On March 15, 2017, Eveland was released by the Rays.

Pericos de Puebla
On May 9, 2017, Eveland signed with the Pericos de Puebla of the Mexican Baseball League. He was released on June 16, 2017.

Pitching style
Eveland throws a four-seam fastball, slider, changeup, and curveball. As of 2014, he began throwing more sliders and substituted his four-seam fastball with a two-seam fastball.

Family
Eveland's brother, Kyle, was drafted by the Milwaukee Brewers in the 43rd round of the 2005 Major League Baseball draft.

References

External links

Career statistics and player information from the KBO League

1983 births
Living people
Águilas de Mexicali players
Albuquerque Isotopes players
American expatriate baseball players in Canada
American expatriate baseball players in Mexico
American expatriate baseball players in South Korea
Arizona Diamondbacks players
Atlanta Braves players
Baltimore Orioles players
Baseball players from Washington (state)
Beloit Snappers players
College of the Canyons Cougars baseball players
Hanwha Eagles players
Helena Brewers players
Hill College Rebels baseball players
Huntsville Stars players
Gwinnett Braves players
Indianapolis Indians players
KBO League pitchers
Las Vegas 51s players
Los Angeles Dodgers players
Major League Baseball pitchers
Mexican League baseball pitchers
Milwaukee Brewers players
Nashville Sounds players
New York Mets players
Norfolk Tides players
Oakland Athletics players
Pawtucket Red Sox players
People from Palmdale, California
Peoria Javelinas players
Pericos de Puebla players
Pittsburgh Pirates players
Sacramento River Cats players
Sportspeople from Olympia, Washington
Tampa Bay Rays players
Toronto Blue Jays players
Tucson Sidewinders players
United States national baseball team players
Visalia Oaks players
2015 WBSC Premier12 players